Discovery Health may refer to:
Discovery Fit & Health, an American cable television network dedicated to fitness and health, launched in 2011 from a merger of Discovery Health Channel and FitTV 
Discovery Health Channel, a former American cable television network which was replaced in 2011 by the OWN: Oprah Winfrey Network and later returned as Discovery Fit & Health later that same year
Discovery Home & Health, a UK television channel formerly known as Discovery Health
Fyi (Canada), the Canadian version of America's * Fyi formerly known as Discovery Health and Twist TV
Discovery Health Medical Scheme, the largest open medical scheme in South Africa. Administered by Discovery Health (Pty) Ltd, a subsidiary of Discovery Limited.